Ramgovind Das (born 15 December 1983) is the Hindu spiritual guru, author and the head of Hari Sharranam Jun. He established Hari Sharranam Jun in 1997. Swami Ramgovind Das  has sponsored the marriage of 111 underprivileged girls in Haldwani which was praised by chief minister of Uttarakhand Pushkar Singh Dhami.

Swami Ramgovind Das has doing works and campaigns against drugs issue in Haldwani. He has been touring foreign places like london and Ireland for spreading spirituality and awareness about Hinduism.
Ramgovind Das awarded the award to Vivek Agnihotri, director of the movie The Kashmir Files for showcasing the truth and the pain people suffered in Kashmir.
Swami Ramgovind Das has written a book on astrology by the name "Sri Narad Astrology for Astrologers".

Bibliography
 "GOLJU", 
 "ECHO", 
 "Sri Narad Astrology for Astrologers", 
 "YOURSELF",  
 "TEACHINGS OF DEATH", 
 "365 DIAMONDS", 
 "BHAKTI KUNJIKA", 
 "TEACHERS",

References

1983 births
Living people
Indian spiritual writers
People from Haldwani
Hindu writers